The Shavano Valley Rock Art Site, in Montrose County, Colorado near the city of Montrose, is a historic site which was listed on the National Register of Historic Places in 2001.  

It is on private land and is accessible by tours arranged by the Ute Museum in Montrose.

References

Archaeological sites in Colorado		
National Register of Historic Places in Montrose County, Colorado